The Juan Muguerza Cross-Country, also known as the Elgoibar Cross-Country, is an annual cross country running competition which takes place each January in Elgoibar, the Basque Country, Spain. It is named as a memorial of local runner Juan Muguerza, a multiple national champion who was killed in 1937 during the bombing of Mungia in the Spanish Civil War.

The competition was first held in 1943 and was a men-only contest, principally between national-level runners. This changed at the 20th anniversary of the race in 1963, when the competition became an international one. Ethiopian runner Mamo Wolde was the first foreign winner and he went on to score three more victories that decade. His performances brought exposure for African runners in Spain and his influence was recognised with the erection of a memorial in his memory in 2003. Having been held every year since 1943, with the exception of cancellations in 1950 and 1981, the Cross Juan Muguerza is one of the longest-running competitions of its type in Spain.

The men's race has typically been contested over distances varying from 9 km to 11 km, with the current race being 10.8 km. A women's short course race was trialled in the late 1960s and became a permanent fixture of the programme in 1972. Initially a two kilometre course, the distance was gradually increased over the lifespan of the competition, resulting in the current distance of 6.6 km. A men's junior race was held in addition to the main senior race in 1963. The current race programme comprises the two senior races and six different age categories for younger runners.

The elite events attract the highest level of international runners, with past winners including IAAF World Cross Country Championships gold medallists Kenenisa Bekele, Paul Tergat, John Ngugi, Derartu Tulu and Edith Masai. The top runners of Spain and Portugal regularly compete at the competition. Among them, world medallists Mariano Haro and Carmen Valero won in Elgoibar in the 1970s, while prominent Portuguese athletes Paulo Guerra and Fernanda Ribeiro took the top honours in the 1990s.

Past senior race winners

National era

International era

Winners by country

References

List of winners
Cross Memorial Juan Muguerza. Association of Road Racing Statisticians (2011-01-21). Retrieved on 2011-03-11.

External links
Official website 
Images from 2011 race

Cross country running competitions
Athletics competitions in Spain
Recurring sporting events established in 1943
Sport in Gipuzkoa
Cross country running in Spain
Annual sporting events in Spain
1943 establishments in Spain